László Batthyány-Strattmann (28 October 1870 – 22 January 1931) was a Hungarian aristocrat and physician. Until 1914, he was known as László Batthyány. A devout Roman Catholic, he became known as the "doctor of the poor" and was beatified by the church in 2003.

Early life
László Batthyány - Strattmann was born on 28 October 1870, in Dunakiliti, Austria-Hungary, into a very old Hungarian aristocratic family, the sixth of ten brothers. The family moved to Austria in 1876. His childhood was marred by the fact that his father left his family and converted to Protestantism in order to marry another woman. Ladislaus' mother died when he was twelve years old.

According to the will of his father, he first prepared himself to care for the vast property of the Batthyánys. He first studied agriculture in Vienna, later also a great number of other subjects, including chemistry, philosophy and music. In this chaotic period in his life, he also fathered an illegitimate daughter.

Career and family

Batthyány became a student of medicine in 1896, and gained his degree of M.D. in 1900. He trained as a general practitioner, but soon specialized in surgery, and later in ophthalmology. This period was also accompanied by a renewal of his religious faith. He met Countess Maria Theresia Coreth zu Coredo und Starkenberg, a devout Roman Catholic, whom he married in Vienna on 10 November 1898. The couple had thirteen children.

In 1902 Batthyány opened a private hospital with twenty-five beds in Kittsee, Austria, where he worked as a general practitioner, later specializing as a surgeon and oculist. During the First World War, the hospital was enlarged to take in wounded soldiers for treatment.

In 1915, Batthyány and his family moved to the castle of Körmend in Hungary, which he had inherited upon the death of his kinsman Prince Edmund Batthyany-Strattmann in 1914; he also inherited the title of "Prince" (German Fürst, Hungarian herceg) and adopted the additional surname of "Strattmann". At Körmend he continued to practise as a doctor, becoming known for treating poor patients for no payment, which gained him the title of "doctor of the poor". Batthyány turned a wing of the castle into a hospital for ophthalmological patients.

Death
At the age of 60, Batthyány was diagnosed with cancer of the bladder and admitted to the Löw sanatorium in Vienna, Austria. After fourteen months of illness, he died in January 1931.

Beatification

The beatification process was begun in 1944 as a joint effort of the Archbishop of Vienna (Austria) and the bishop of Szombathely (Hungary). The process became forgotten for some time afterwards, before it was taken up again in 1982 due to the initiative of the bishop of Eisenstadt (Austria), Stefan László. On 11 July 1992 László Batthyány-Strattmann was declared a Venerable - a necessary step for beatification. He was beatified on 23 March 2003 by Pope John Paul II. Five years later, on 23 March 2008, the fifth anniversary of his beatification, the Dr. Ladislaus Batthyány-Strattmann confraternity of prayer for the canonization of the poor's doctor was invested by the archbishop of Vienna Christoph Cardinal Schönborn as a private association, being entitled under the justification of canon law.

References

Further reading
 Josef Dirnbeck: Geöffnete Augen. Ladislaus Batthyány-Strattmann und sein Leben als "Arzt der Armen". Güssing 2003. 
 Rudolf Kroyer: Ladislaus Batthyány-Strattmann - EIn Leben im Dienste Gottes und der Menschen. Eisenstadt 1986/1999
 Erzsébet Pálffy-Batthyány: Batthyány-Strattmann László ferences herceg. Budapest 1931
Mária Puskely: Dr. Batthyány-Strattmann László. 1870-1931. Dokumentált életrajz. Budapest 2001

External links 
 Official biography on the Vatican website
  of the Batthyany Family
 Dr. Ladislaus Batthyány-Strattmann, a confraternity of prayer

Hungarian nobility
Hungarian general practitioners
Hungarian ophthalmologists
Members of the Hungarian Academy of Sciences
Hungarian beatified people
Laszlo
20th-century venerated Christians
1870 births
People from Győr-Moson-Sopron County
Hungarian people of German descent
1931 deaths
Deaths from cancer in Austria
Beatifications by Pope John Paul II
Venerated Catholics by Pope John Paul II
Deaths from bladder cancer
20th-century Hungarian physicians
Knights of the Golden Fleece of Austria
Grand Crosses of the Order of Saint Stephen of Hungary